Homalopoma crassicostata is a species of minute sea snail, a marine gastropod mollusc in the family Colloniidae.

Distribution  
This species occurs in New Zealand.

References

Colloniidae
Gastropods described in 1905